Mirco Reseg (October 28, 1972 in Düsseldorf) is a German actor and comedian.

Life

Reseg attended the Gerhart-Hauptmann-Realschule in Hanover. He has previously worked in television productions such as Sechserpack, Cologne P.D. and Lindenstraße.  Reseg currently lives in Hamburg-Eimsbüttel.

External links

 Officially Site at SA1 
 

1972 births
Living people
Actors from Düsseldorf
German male television actors
German comedy musicians
People from Eimsbüttel